Guy Ritchie's Gamekeeper is a comic book series from Virgin Comics and film director Guy Ritchie.

Credits 
Guy Ritchie's Gamekeeper was created by Guy Ritchie, and the first volume was written by Andy Diggle, with art and color by Mukesh Singh, the current artist of Jenna Jameson's Shadow Hunter, also from Virgin Comics.

Volume 2 is being written by Jeff Parker and illustrated by Ron Randall and Ron Chan, with covers by Singh.

Story 
The man known only as Brock lives a quiet existence as gamekeeper on a secluded Scottish estate. The tranquility is disrupted when Russian paramilitary mercenaries storm the estate and kill Jonah Morgan, Brock's friend and owner of the estate. To avenge Jonah's death and protect a secret equation, Brock must turn predator and journey deep into an unfamiliar, urban underworld. Throughout his journey, he is plagued by a dark past and his son's death.

Publications 
Issue #1 was released in March 2007. The trade paperback entitled "Guy Ritchie's Gamekeeper: Tooth and Claw", which includes issues #1–5, was released in October 2007.

Reception 
The series has received an overall favorable critical reception.
A review of issue #1 by Wizard Entertainment praised the artwork and the story for its characterizations and plot twists.
Issue #1 received a B+ by Variety blog Bags and Boards, which commended its originality and artwork.

Adaptation 
Warner Brothers has acquired the rights to the series for Silver Pictures to produce and Ritchie to direct.

References

External links 
Liquid Comics: Gatekeeper
LA Times: Lock, stock and 'Gamekeeper'

2007 comics debuts